Eirik Wollen Steen (born 3 October, 1993) is a Norwegian footballer. He plays as a defender for Åsane.

Club career 
Wollen Steen was born in Norway. He made his senior debut for Åsane on 26 June 2013 against Fløy; Åsane lost 4–1. He signed for Eliteserien side Bodø/Glimt before the 2018 season.

Career statistics

References 

1993 births
Living people
Norwegian footballers
Åsane Fotball players
Norwegian First Division players
Eliteserien players
Association football defenders
FK Bodø/Glimt players